Thunder Mountain is a 1947 American Western film directed by Lew Landers and starring Tim Holt and Martha Hyer. It was the first of Holt's 29 post war Western star vehicles and the first in a series of Zane Grey adaptations he made for RKO. It was also the first film of his written by Norman Houston who would go on to write 19 more for the star.

The film began production as To the Last Man but the studio had trouble clearing the title because of a proposed Liberty Films project called The Last Man, so they used the title of the Zane Grey novel.

Premise
A cowboy fights against crooks trying to control his land.

Cast
Tim Holt as Marvin Hayden
Martha Hyer as Ellie Jorth
Richard Martin as Chito Rafferty
Steve Brodie as Chick Jorth
Virginia Owen as Ginger Kelly
Jason Robards Sr. as Jim Gardner (as Jason Robards)
Harry Woods as Trimble Carson
Tom Keene as Johnny Blue (as Richard Powers)
Robert Clarke as Lee Jorth
Harry Harvey as Sheriff Bagley

Production
Filming began in October 1946.

Reception
The film was made for a relatively high budget for a B Western. This was partly responsible for it making a profit of only $17,000.

References

External links

1947 films
1947 Western (genre) films
American Western (genre) films
Films based on works by Zane Grey
RKO Pictures films
American black-and-white films
Films directed by Lew Landers
1940s American films
1940s English-language films